Dalys la Caribeña (born February 20, 1975 in Panama) is a Panamanian luchadora, or female professional wrestler currently working for the Mexican professional wrestling promotion Lucha Libre AAA Worldwide (AAA). Her name appears in print as Dalys la Caribeña, Dalys, Dallys and Dalis but all refer to the same person. Her name means Daly "The Caribbean Girl". She is a second-generation wrestler, her father is a retired wrestler turned wrestling promoter in Panama, her brother wrestles in Mexico under the ring name Veneno and she is related through marriage to Negro Casas to the extended Casas wrestling family.

Dalys is best known for her work in Consejo Mundial de Lucha Libre (CMLL), where she held the CMLL World Women's Championship and the CMLL Japanese Women's Championship both once.

Personal life
Dalys' full birthname has not been publicly revealed, only that her last name by birth is Medina Baeza. She is the daughter of a Panamanian wrestling promoter and the sister of professional wrestler Rafael Ernesto Medina Baeza, better known under the ring name Veneno (Spanish for "Venom"). At some point Mexican wrestler José Casas Ruiz, better known as Negro Casas worked for her father's wrestling promotion, which led to the two being married and Dalys moving to Mexico City, Mexico. She is a member of the extensive Casas wrestling through her marriage to José Casas starting with her father-in-law retired wrestler and current referee Pepe Casas and also consists of her brothers-in-law Erick Francisco Casas Ruiz, who wrestles as "Heavy Metal" and Jorge Luis Casas Ruiz, who wrestles as "El Felino" plus a brother-in-law who is not a professional wrestler. Dalys' sister-in-law (Felino's wife) is also a wrestler, Blanca Rodríguez, better known as Princessa Blanca. Dalys and Casas have two daughters who are training in Olympic style wrestling, also hoping to turn professional one day. José Casas does not train his daughters, entrusting that task to Ringo Mendoza, Tony Salazar, Arturo Beristain and Franco Colombo. One of her daughters is married to professional wrestler Diamante. She also has two nephews who are wrestlers under the ring names Tiger and Puma King, the sons of Jorge Casa and step-sons of Blanca Rodríguez. She has a background in Kickboxing and would be seen sparring with Negro Casas during features on him. She also sat at ringside during important matches and was acknowledge as his wife, although the focus on their family relationship has been downplayed since Daly turned professional. The family relationship between Princesa Blanca, who works as a ruda (A wrestler that portrays the "bad guy" character) and Dalys la Caribeña, who works as a tecnica ("good guy") has been downplayed by CMLL.

Professional wrestling career
Dalys' training for an in-ring career was done initially by Negro Casas, but generally handled to the trainers of the Consejo Mundial de Lucha Libre (CMLL) wrestling school. Her first match came about sooner than originally planned as she was needed to substitute for wrestler Estrella Mágica in a match, teaming with Lady Apache and Star Fire to defeat the team of Hiroka, La Seductora and her sister-in-law Princesa Blanca. Since she was a last minute substitute her in-ring debut did not garner much attention from the press. Her officially promoted in-ring debut came almost two months later as she was one of ten women competing in a torneo cibernetico, multi-man elimination match for the rights to challenge for the CMLL World Women's Championship. The match also included Estrella Mágica, Hiroka, Lady Apache, La Nazi, Lluvia, Princesa Blanca, Princesa Sujei, Zeuxis and match winner Marcela. On June 18, 2010 she participated in her first major CMLL event with an appearance during the 2012 Infierno en el Ring show. She was brought in as a replacement for Luna Mágica who was originally scheduled to team with Lady Apache and Marcela. The team wrestled against Las Zorras ("The Foxes"; Princesa Blanca and Princesa Sujei) and La Seductora. Las Zorras took the first fall after Princesa Sujei pinned Lady Apache following a Torbellino splash and Princesa Blanca pinned Dalys. In the second fall the tecnicas regained momentum when Marcela executed what was described as a "brutal Michinoku Driver" on La Seductora and pinned her. In the final fall Dalys la Caribena uses the Casas family trademark La Casita cradle to gain the three count and the victory for her team. She was also part of the 2011 Sin Piedad ("Without mercy") show, she worked in the second match of the night,   a Best two-out-of-three falls Six-man tag team match with the Tecnica team of Dalys, Lady Apache and Marcela faced off against Princesa Sujei, Princesa Blanca and Tiffany. The teams split the first two falls with Dalys, Apache and Marcela winning the first fall and their opponents winning the second fall. In the third fall Princesa Blanca accidentally kicked the referee, which led to her team being disqualified in the third fall and thus losing the match. Through her contacts in CMLL Dalys was able to travel to Japan in April and May, 2012 working on shows for CMLL's partner promotion Reina X World as well as a Kaientai Dojo show. Throughout the month of June a number of CMLL's female competitors got involved in various storylines that escalated to the point where they were all put into one match to settle their issues. The match was the main event of the 2012 Infierno en el Ring event, competing in the eponymous Infierno en el Ring steel cage match, a multi-person Steel cage match contested under Lucha de Apuestas, or bet match, rules which means that the loser of the match would be forced to unmask or have their hair shaved off per Lucha Libre traditions. Besides Dalys the competitors included La Seductora, Goya Kong, La Amapola, Estrellita, Dark Angel, Lady Apache, Tiffany, Marcela and Princesa Blanca. In the end Princesa Blanca pinned Goya Kong, forcing her to unmask afterwards. Dalys was the first person to escape the cage by climbing up over it, keeping her hair safe. She also appeared on CMLL's biggest show of the year, the CMLL 79th Anniversary Show where she, Goya Kong and Marcela defeated La Amapola, Princesa Blanca and Tiffany. On March 21, 2014, at Homenaje a Dos Leyendas, Dalys was defeated by Marcela in a Lucha de Apuestas and was as a result shaved bald. On March 11, 2016, Dalys defeated Marcela to win the CMLL World Women's Championship.

On January 21, 2023, Dalys and her husband Negro Casas appeared at a  Lucha Libre AAA Worldwide television taping in Querétaro, marking their departures from CMLL. On January 28, Dalys made her AAA in-ring debut, teaming with Lady Shani and Miss Delicious to defeat Maravilla, La Hiedra, and Mary Caporal during a house show. On February 5, at Rey de Reyes, Dalys participated in the 2023 Reina de Reinas match, which was won by Sexy Star II.

Championships and accomplishments
Consejo Mundial de Lucha Libre
CMLL Japanese Women's Championship (1 time, current)	
CMLL World Women's Championship (1 time)
Copa Lucha Feminil X
CMLL Bodybuilding Contest: Women's Category (2013, 2015)
CMLL Universal Amazons Championship (2019)
 International Women's Grand Prix (2022)
Copa Bicentenario (2022) - with Lady Frost
 Pro Wrestling Illustrated
Ranked No. 70 of the top 100 female wrestlers in the PWI Female 100 in 2018

Luchas de Apuestas record

References

1975 births
Panamanian emigrants to Mexico
Panamanian female professional wrestlers
Living people
Unidentified wrestlers
21st-century professional wrestlers
CMLL World Women's Champions